Rushworth is a township in Victoria, Australia.

History
Rushworth was established during the Victorian gold rush in 1853. It was named by poet and later local Goldfields Commissioner Richard Henry Horne in 1854. Its post office opened on 16 September 1857.

The goldfields became no longer viable due to the underground water table and were closed during the gold rush.

The Rushworth Magistrates' Court closed on 1 January 1990.

Athletics
The town has an Australian rules football team competing in the Kyabram & District Football League.

Golfers play at the course of the Rushworth Golf Club on Tatura Road.

Gallery

See also
Whroo, Victoria
Balaclava Mine

References

Towns in Victoria (Australia)